is a Japanese anime television series. It is the eighth anime series in the Digimon franchise and a reboot of the original 1999 anime television series of the same title that follows the contemporary adventures of children in the world of Digimon, struggling to prevent a series of disasters spreading into real world. 

It was broadcast for 67 episodes on Fuji TV from April 2020 to September 2021, while the series was simulcasted worldwide through Crunchyroll. In February 2022, it was announced that the series would receive an English dub, which is set to premiere in Q2 2023.

Plot

In 2020, a series of cyber-attacks across Tokyo are the result of catastrophic events in another world within the internet, the Digital World, where creatures called Digimon roam. Taichi "Tai" Kamiya, a young boy gets transported to the internet and meets Agumon while they are attacked by a swarm of Argomon. They meet up with Yamato "Matt" Ishida and his partner Gabumon and together they defeat the Mega Argomon as Omnimon.

While getting ready for summer camp, Tai, Matt, Sora Takenouchi, Koshiro "Izzy" Izumi, Mimi Tachikawa and Joe Kido are transported to the Digital World where they acquire Digivices and Digimon partners while learning that they have been chosen to stop the evil Dark Digimon army causing attacks both the Network and the Digital World. They are lured into a fake Tokyo dimension where Eyesmon, another opponent attacks them. Omnimon is able to destroy Nidhoggmon (Eyesmon's Mega form) before the countdown to annihilate the real Tokyo in the Real World happens.

They are joined by Takeru "T.K." Takaishi, Matt's brother on their mission to stop Devimon, an evil Digimon who rules the Cloud Continent. Later, after Devimon's defeat, T.K. becomes partners with Patamon on the Eternal Continent where they learn that another Holy Digimon named Gatomon, had been corrupted into SkullKnightmon/DarkKnightmon. They are joined by Tai's sister Kari, who serves as their guide to the Sealed Grounds, where Millenniummon, an ultimate weapon of the Dark Digimon, is to be revived. During their journey, they defeat DarkKnightmon, who reverts back into her true form Gatomon, and becomes Kari’s partner, and along the way, they befriend several friendly Digimon, and the remaining Digimon partners reunite and continue their quest to stop Millenniummon. However, Sakkakumon, a servant of Millenniummon, captures Tai, Matt, Izzy, and T.K. and their Digimon partners in its sphere, where they are forced to fight copies of their past defeated opponents. T.K. and Patamon were confronted by Devimon again, who revealed that he was an entity of Patamon. Patamon absorbs Devimon, becoming his ultimate form and defeats the sphere, helping the others escape. Unfortunately, Millenniummon's servants, Vademon and Sakkakumon were able to restore Millenniummon's body and was unleashed in an attempt to destroy the entire Digital World, but was defeated by WarGreymon with the hopes of the friendly Digimon the DigiDestined befriended in their adventure.

Finally, after Millenniummon's defeat, all eight DigiDestined must discover the true power of the Crests in their Digivices to stop Negamon, the benefactor of the Dark Digimon and the creator of the Argomon and Eyesmon, from bringing the Great Catastrophe (and also learn that Omnimon can stop Negamon). Tai and Agumon encountered the Argomon again, and this time meet a humanoid Argomon sent by Negamon to test Taichi and Agumon's bond. After reuniting with each other, the DigiDestined face a swarm of Soundbirdmon, who digivolve to their true form, Ghoulmon. After Ghoulmon's defeat, Negamon was released from its prison and begins the Great Catastrophe. The DigiDestined come face to face with their final enemy after defeating the humanoid Argomon. A brutal battle between Negamon and the DigiDestined begins and later, Negamon digivolves into Abbadomon and destroys the physical forms of four of the DigiDestined while Tai, Kari, T.K. and Matt continue to fight Abbadomon. The hopes of the humanity restore the four children back into their physical forms and enable Agumon and Gabumon to fuse into Omnimon. Taichi, Yamato, and Omnimon enter Abbadomon where they confront the core body. After a great battle, Omnimon destroys Abbadomon who reformats into a Digi-Egg and peace of both worlds were restored.

In the epilogue, the DigiDestined return home accompanied by their Digimon partners in secret while Tai chose to remain in the Digital World to explore it there with Agumon.

Characters

Production

Background
The series was officially announced in the March issue of Shueisha's V Jump magazine in January 2020. The project was developed independently and in the same period of time as the theatrical release of Digimon Adventure: Last Evolution Kizuna, by producer Hiroyuki Sakurada and series director Masato Mitsuka, initially together behind Digimon Xros Wars and Dragon Ball Super. Matsuki Hanae and Naoko Sagawa are also the producers, Atsuhiro Tomioka is supervising the series scripts, Katsuyoshi Nakatsuru returns from Digimon Adventure to design the characters, Akihiro Asanuma is the chief animation director, Ryouka Kinoshita is the art director, Toshiki Amada is in charge of art setting.

The opportunity of a reboot of the original Digimon Adventure series was hoped for since the days of Digimon Adventure tri. by Hiroyuki Sakurada, then producer of Dragon Ball Super. Sakurada expressed that the stopping point of the original Adventure series reached on its twentieth anniversary by Last Evolution Kizuna was "sad", but opportune to be able to propose, produce this reboot and deliver it in its current form, terming it as a proper Digimon entry that wasn't for the "children of the past", but for a new generation of children "And in order to introduce it to them, what better way to do it than to start from the beginning one more time with Digimon Adventure?" while mentioning the difficulties encountered to find the right timing back then, as the production team wanted to broadcast Digimon again on Fuji TV at 9 a.m. on Sunday morning "To secure that timeslot and produce content for it, you need the right timing and right elements for all sorts of things. Without such a close gamble, it’s difficult to produce a TV anime". The nine o'clock slot on Sunday morning is the historical timeslot for the first five Digimon series on Fuji TV, from 1999 to 2007.

The original Digimon Adventure staff, working on the movie Last Evolution Kizuna, was not consulted for this project. Masato Mitsuka was referred to as a director "representing the younger generation"; "He ensures the future of Toei Animation, as well as the rest of its staff," said Hiroyuki Sakurada.

Development
Hiroyuki Sakurada indicated that the highlights of this series would be the battle scenes, the "special trait" of each Digimon and how they would deal with the abilities of the Digimons that will attack them. Atsuhiro Tomioka announced that as many different Digimon as possible will be shown, defining it as a festival "according to the situation, without holding back".

"Our important task is to make sure things come across to the viewer as cool" stated Masato Mitsuka and specified that, although they were very enthusiastic about wanting to show off the pride of a Digimon of the Champion-level, they had trouble thinking about how to portray "cool" action sequences using the physics of the Digimon and especially Greymon, compared to Son Goku and his panoply of attacks in the director's work on Dragon Ball Super ; Mitsuka also claimed in August 2020 that the Digimon will reach the Ultimate-level very quickly, so in the long run, the time Agumon will actively spend as a Greymon will be gone ; calling Omnimon one of the most impressive "symbols" of Digimon to this very day with many derivatives. Its appearance and the when and how in the series were determined even before Mitsuka was brought into the project.

In response to the Japanese media outlet What's In, calling the first three episodes "A start close to be a cinematic project, yet chaotic" by the story developments ; Sakurada said that the intention behind it was to display freshness without waiting. For Mitsuka, the overuse of privileged segments in the animation for a TV anime was to show Greymon ; and Omnimon looking "cool" from its first fight, in order to leave just as much of a strong impression on those new viewers as on the old ones, a proper action-like depiction of it being uncommon in the previous projects, special circumstances protecting it for very particular moments, this production aimed to depict Omnimon as the miracle that appears after overcoming great difficulties "May each of its appearances in this new TV series be a chance to make it fight powerful enemies, while displaying his strength and a status of crisis saviour". Mitsuka wanted to portray children actively fighting in the fights, a story in which the children participate with a keen awareness of what they have to save. "The children feel an obligation and a determination to "do something" [...] The central theme of the series' direction is "a person and a creature" in both battle and adventure. It is the "way of life" that seduces me, my vision of the link between the two".

Producer Sakurada invited children to have the feeling of traveling through this anime "even if they are stuck at home [...] From the jungle to the oceans, discover a vast world without constraints"; by experiencing things that had become difficult due to the COVID-19 pandemic, in August 2020. Atsuhiro Tomioka has been called to be the main screenwriter of the project, with the request of Toei Animation to take the manga Digimon Adventure V-Tamer 01 as a reference. "Of course, [Tai] still works together with other allies, but we want him to be a heroic figure with a strong sense of responsibility and dependability. It's a willingness with the director and the production team to mix influences".

The show premiered on April 5, 2020, on Fuji TV. In mid-2020, Toei Animation Europe listed Adventure for 66 episodes. On September 2, 2021, a 67th episode was announced. Two weeks later it was confirmed the series would end with 67 episodes and be succeeded by Digimon Ghost Game.

Marketing
On March 30, 2020, Toei Animation organized an advertising campaign at Shibuya Stream, a retail complex in Tokyo's Shibuya district and in the Shibuya Station with posters and animations. On March 19, 2021, Toei Animation unveiled a new key visual that hinted at new digivolved forms appearing within the series; with new taglines: "Everything of "Digimon Adventure" is Epic! The story reaches its climax!" and a marketing campaign based on the buzzword "Epic"  on social media.

Broadcast and distribution
On March 6, the first trailer for the series was released, announcing the series' April 5, 2020 premiere date. Digimon Adventure: has been broadcast on Fuji Television, and became available for streaming on Netflix, U-NEXT, Bandai Channel, Anime Hodai and Docomo Anime Store in Japan. On April 19, 2020, Toei Animation announced that the fourth scheduled episode and new episodes would be delayed due to the COVID-19 pandemic. A delay of about two months occurred until the return of the show; from April 26 to May 31, 2020, GeGeGe no Kitarō reruns in Digimon Adventure: timeslot. Episodes were rebroadcast from the first episode beginning June 7. Toei Animation later announced on June 19 that the series would resume broadcasting new episodes starting with episode 4 on June 28.

Crunchyroll began streaming the series starting April 4, 2020. The series is distributed simultaneously by Crunchyroll in North America, Central America, the Caribbean, South America, Europe, the MENA and CIS zones, Australia, New Zealand and South Africa with English, Spanish, French, Portuguese, Arabic, Italian, German and Russian subtitles. The anime was also simulcast on Hulu (1–49) and VRV in the United States; AnimeLab (1–52)/Funimation ANZ (from episode 53–60) in Australia and New Zealand; and iQIYI (1–48) in Southeast Asia with English subtitles and other languages including Chinese, Vietnamese and Thai. In France, the anime is also available on Anime Digital Network and J-One.

In May 2021, iQIYI stopped its simulcast at episode 48. Hulu stopped its simulcast at episode 49, having bought a licence for the first 49 episodes. Previously released episodes remained available on demand until February 2023; the licensing agreement was not renewed for further episodes during the simulcast. On August 11, 2021, AnimeLab and Funimation ANZ announced that they were unable to offer new weekly episodes. Toei Animation Europe announced that the show would run for 66 episodes, though on September 2, 2021, the episode count was official changed to 67 episodes on Bandai's calendar. The series ended on September 26, 2021, with a total of 67 episodes and was succeeded by Digimon Ghost Game, at the same time slot on Fuji TV.

On February 26, 2022, the Digimon Con 2022 event announced that the series is getting an English dub that will star Zeno Robinson as Tai and Ben Diskin as Agumon, through a dubbed trailer and two videos of the voice actors. Tai's original English actor, Joshua Seth, revealed that the cast was informed by the producers months ago that they would be recasting everyone and that no one from the old cast would be returning. The first two episodes aired as a special preview at Toei Animation's booth at the Anime NYC 2022 event on November 19, 2022. The English dub is set to premiere in Q2 2023.

Soundtrack
Composer Toshihiko Sahashi was commissioned to write forty compositions by the director of the series. The idea explored was sounds played by a large orchestra. A first recording was conducted on February 25, 2020. Two soundtrack albums were released by Nippon Columbia. The first volume on September 30, 2020, featuring 34 tracks and the second volume on August 25, 2021, for 31 tracks.

The opening theme for the series is "Mikakunin Hikousen", performed by Takayoshi Tanimoto. Tanimoto also sung three Insert Songs. The first is "Be The Winners", which is the theme song for the Champion level digivolutions, the second is "X-treme Fight", which is the theme song for the Ultimate level digivolutions and the third is "Break the Chain", which is the theme song for the Mega level digivolutions.

The first ending theme during episodes 1-13 is "Kuyashisa wa Tane" by Chiai Fujikawa. The second ending theme during episodes 14-26 is "Q?" by Reol. The third ending theme during episodes 27-38 is "Mind Game" by Maica_n. The fourth ending theme during episodes 39-54 is "Overseas Highway" by Wolpis Carter and Orangestar. The fifth ending theme during episodes 55-67 is "Dreamers" by the K-pop boy band Ateez.

DVD/Blu-ray
Digimon Adventure: was distributed in Japan on DVD and Blu-ray by Happinet: in a first box set on December 2, 2020, containing the first 12 episodes. Episodes 13 to 24 were released in a second box set on March 3, 2021. Episodes 25 to 36 were released in a third box set on June 2, 2021. Episodes 37 to 48 were released in a fourth box set on September 3, 2021. Episodes 49 to 67 were released in a fifth, and final, box set on February 2, 2022.

Reception

Early responses

As the series is not only the reboot of the first anime, but also the first Digimon series to be simultaneously distributed around the world, the launch attracted a great amount of media coverage and critical reviews. The announcement and debut of the anime was encouraged by qualities seen in the original series. Digimon Adventure: is considered part of the reboots & revivals craze seen in the West and Japan in the early 2020s.

First impressions of the series' debut episodes were mostly positive-to-mixed with production values being praised; although criticized for noticeably recycled plot beats from previous productions and specifically the Digimon movie' Our War Game!, Polygon's Karen Han felt that Masato Mitsuka's take lacked a sense of character, both in terms of the world it takes place in, and the characters themselves. and Joshua Graves of Comic Book Resources feels that "it comes across more as a disservice to fans". Most critics were puzzled by the general approach and shared some concerns about the possibilities of world-building, character developments, the way the show can keep the stakes presented meaningful and the series' potential for reaching a new audience due to the pace, the lack of introductions and exposition about the overall concept and the digivolutions as anything other than regarded as a "senseless plot boost" in this early stage.

Critical response
Digimon Adventure: received harsh responses and criticism through its run and, getting panned due to the overall structure, style, prioritization of the story and the lack of motivating ideas of the plot, as well as the absence of character, emotional and interpersonal dynamics developments, "an absurd character psychology with no sense of wonder nor amazement"; and an excessive focus on Tai, sidelining the other characters in favor of successive episodes of showdowns, fights and unearned power-ups.

Digimon Adventure: was named one of "The Worst Anime of 2020" by Anime News Network in their year-end selection; termed as a failure and a wasted attempt, Christopher Farris criticized the lack of planning of the staff behind it and the lack of development for characters with ready-made connections, for audiences who might remember them and their power-levels enough, to justify any real interest or investment in. Manga News considered it as a lazy and a hardly praiseworthy work for such prolific figures, "artificial" for some action and digivolution moneyshots. Writing for Comic Book Resources, Laura Thornton criticized its reintroduction of some talking Digimon after thirty episodes for essentially portraying them as victims to be protected by Tai rather than making them proper characters with a culture or unique problem and stated it as fatigued story "not only for its characters but for the audience as well", far removed from the light-hearted episodes in the original series, but also from models such as My Hero Academia or Avatar: The Last Airbender, perceived as important and considering that constant spectacle of over-the-top fights "has long grown stale"; Hannah Collins deplored that its "trade" for "spectacle" meant "near-constant separation of the main group". As the forty-episode mark was reached; what were considered to be the first demonstrations of development and interaction would be observed in the first filler episodes of the series; these episodes also received a more favorable critical reception for their more episodic, calm and humorous tone.

Digimon Adventure: was regarded as predicated on a nostalgia simplified to "mere style references" and a feeling of false-familiarity.; the commercial target was considered ambiguous; Manga-News then questioned the legitimacy of such regarding the intentions of Digimon Adventure: Last Evolution Kizuna. The anime is also observed as an attempt to turn Digimon Adventure into action-packed genres and to expand marketing with ingredients similar and compared to what was done with the Dragon Ball franchise in the 2010s.

Public response
Responses from fans and spectators would be observed by various media and the international broadcaster as very mixed through its run. Promotional images of episode 38 "The Blazing Blue Friendship", depicting crucifixions; went viral; spreading via memes from fans and nostalgics.

Daniel Dockery, senior writer for Crunchyroll expressed his understanding of viewers' disappointment due to, among other things, the excessive focus on Tai and said that the series doubled down on the aspects that the creators found to be the most appealing "Namely the idea of [Tai] as a hero and the Digimon as combatants. I understand it if isn't everyone's cup of tea".

Although the producer's ambition was to bring the franchise back "for a new generation of children"; Toei Animation declared that the series "struggled to acquire new audiences of children" in May 2021. The official reason given was the COVID-19 pandemic.

TV ratings
Six episodes can be seen in the TV Rankings of Japanese Animation: Episode 6 "The Targeted Kingdom", on July 12, 2020 (for 2.9% rating), episode 11 "The Wolf Standing Atop the Desert", on August 16, 2020 (for 2.3% rating), episode 40 "Strike! The Killer Shot", on March 21, 2021 (for 2.6% rating), episode 58 "Hikari New Life", on July 25, 2021 (for 1.9% rating), episode 59 "Bolt, HerakleKabuterimon", on August 1, 2021 (for 2.3% rating), and episode 60 "Vikemon Ventures the Glaciers", on August 8, 2021 (for 1.5% rating). Due to the spread of COVID-19, from April 26 to May 31, 2020, it was Kitarō (2018) that was temporarily rerun in the slot of Digimon, the repeats of the first episodes of Adventure: and its pilot aired from June 7, 2020, with unranked ratings.

References

External links
  
 

Adventure
2020 anime television series debuts
Adventure anime and manga
Animated television series about children
Animated television series reboots
Anime postponed due to the COVID-19 pandemic
Anime productions suspended due to the COVID-19 pandemic
Crunchyroll anime
Fuji TV original programming
Japanese children's animated adventure television series
Japanese children's animated science fantasy television series
Science fantasy anime and manga
Toei Animation television
Television series set in 2020